Myles Francis Goodwyn (born Miles Francis Goodwin on ) is a Canadian musician. He is the only original remaining member of the rock band April Wine, in which he is the lead vocalist, guitarist, and principal songwriter. Goodwyn has led the band since its inception and modest garage band roots to multi-platinum sales and peak. Goodwyn has appeared and performed on every April Wine release.

Following the band's peak and commercial success during the 1970s and early '80s, Goodwyn disbanded April Wine and pursued a solo career. After a brief relocation to the Bahamas, Goodwyn returned to Canada and reformed April Wine in 1992. He continues to lead the band to the present day.

In 2002, Goodwyn was the recipient of the National Achievement Award at the annual SOCAN Awards held in Toronto. In , he received an ECMA Lifetime Achievement Award for his impact on the music industry of Atlantic Canada.

In , Goodwyn stated in an interview that he had been in the studio recording his second album Myles Goodwyn & Friends of the Blues. It will be an all-blues album featuring guest performers such as Amos Garrett, David Wilcox, Frank Marino, Kenny "Blues Boss" Wayne and Rick Derringer.

In 2016, his autobiography, Just Between You and Me, was released. In 2018, his second album Myles Goodwyn and Friends of the Blues was released.

On December, 20, 2022, it was announced Goodwyn will be retiring from April Wine and music altogether due to his diabetes and poor health. Goodwyn’s final live performance was on March, 2, 2023, in Nova Scotia.

Discography

with April Wine

Studio albums 

 April Wine (1971)
 On Record (1972)
 Electric Jewels (1973)
 Stand Back (1975)
 The Whole World's Goin' Crazy (1976)
 Forever for Now (1977)
 First Glance (1978)
 Harder ... Faster (1979)
 The Nature of the Beast (1981)
 Power Play (1982)
 Animal Grace (1984)
 Walking Through Fire (1985)
 Attitude (1993)
 Frigate (1994)
 Back to the Mansion (2001)
 Roughly Speaking (2006)

Solo 
 Myles Goodwyn (1988)

 Myles Goodwyn and Friends of the Blues (2018)

Singles 
Do You Know What I Mean (with Lee Aaron) (1988) [#47 CAN]
 My Girl (1988) [#18 CAN]
Are You Still Loving Me (1988) [#88 CAN]

Production credits

See also 
 April Wine
 April Wine discography
 Music of Canada

References

External links 
 April Wine's official website

1948 births
Living people
April Wine members
Canadian rock guitarists
Canadian male guitarists
Canadian rock keyboardists
Canadian male singers
Canadian rock singers
Canadian singer-songwriters
Canadian record producers
Musicians from Woodstock, New Brunswick